Alexander Vladimirovich Medvedev (born 20 May 1975), also known as Shura, is a Russian singer/songwriter.

He reached his career peak at the end of the 1990s. He gained popularity due to his unconventional appearance (including his lack of front teeth) and performance.

Early life
Was born in Novosibirsk on May 20, 1975. His parents met when his mother Svetlana was 17 years old and his father Vladimir was 20 years old. A year later she gave birth to Sasha. Shortly after, his parents separated and his mother married Nikolay Dudchenko. His father did not take part in the life of his son. Alexander was an unwanted child who was beaten by his mother and was given to an orphanage when he was nine. His teeth were knocked out by his younger brother Mikhail, with whom he often feuded.

From age 12, he sang in the Novosibirsk restaurant "Rus", where his grandmother Vera Mikhailovna worked as chef. Shura did not finish high school. He was expelled after the seventh grade with a certificate of "incomplete secondary education".

Shura went to Riga, where he graduated from the course of designers and florists and received a master's diploma in making ikebana. In the mid-1990s, Shura became a "mass-entertainer". He began to sing songs of Novosibirsk composer Pavel Yesenin when he was 17.

On January 10, 2018, he underwent surgery for a hip replacement at the Russian Ilizarov Scientific Center for Restorative Traumatology and Orthopaedics.

Personal life 
In spite of his perceived homosexuality, which he called part of his image, Shura introduced his fiancée Lisa to the public in May 2010.

Shura was a drug addict. He spent $2,000 for treating his drug addiction.

He was diagnosed with testicular cancer. He underwent an operation and 18 rounds of chemotherapy. The rehabilitation period lasted four years. During that time, he was reliant on a wheelchair and had a tremor in his right hand that lasted a year and a half. He spent roughly a million dollars on treatment in clinics in Russia and Switzerland. In 2019, during the period of his drug addiction, Shura gifted his flat to scammers. On April 30, 2019, the Russian Court rejected his claim against the scammers.

Awards 
In 1998, he was awarded the Golden Gramophone Award for the song "Do Not Believe in Tears".

References

External links
 
 Официальная группа Шуры ВКонтакте

1975 births
20th-century Russian musicians
21st-century Russian musicians
Living people
Musicians from Novosibirsk
Russian pop singers
Russian singer-songwriters
20th-century Russian singers
21st-century Russian singers
20th-century Russian male singers
21st-century Russian male singers
Winners of the Golden Gramophone Award